Luminița Pișcoran (born 14 March 1988) is a Romanian biathlete.

Career
Pișcoran competed in the 2014/15 world cup season, and represented Romania at the 2011, 2012, 2013 and 2015 Biathlon World Championships.

References

External links 
 

1988 births
Living people
Romanian female biathletes